Selb is a town in the district of Wunsiedel, in Upper Franconia, Bavaria, Germany. It is situated in the Fichtelgebirge, on the border with the Czech Republic, 20 km northwest of Cheb and 23 km southeast of Hof.

Selb is well known for its porcelain manufacture, and is the home of the Rosenthal (company) factory, founded in 1879 by Philipp Rosenthal as a family business. The town served in the 1960s as the location for an unrealized town development plan prepared by Walter Gropius shortly before his death.

Notable people
 Manfred Ahne (born 1961), German icehockey player
 Sebastian Bösel (born 1994), German football player
 Siegfried Hausner (1952-1975), a member of the Red Army Faction, was born and raised in Selb
 Florian Ondruschka (born 1987), German icehockey player
 Richard Rogler (born 1949), German satirist, Kabarett artist and professor of Kabarett at the University of the Arts in Berlin
 Philipp Rosenthal (1855-1937) founder of Rosenthal enterprise
 Philip Rosenthal (industrialist) (1916-2001) son of above, reclaimed factory from Nazis, became leading SPD politician 
 Peter Schiller (1957-2020), German ice hockey player
 The ski mountaineer and mountain biker Andreas Strobel was born 1972 in Selb

References

Wunsiedel (district)